The Party for Liberty and Development (in French Parti pour les Libertés et le Développement or PLD) is a Chadian political party led by Ibni Oumar Mahamat Saleh. An opposition party based in the Muslim and Arab east, it took three seats in the 1997 parliamentary election. The party boycotted the 2002 parliamentary election, as it voiced doubts of a free and fair vote.

Political parties in Chad
Politics of Chad